Larry Dale Ray (born March 11, 1958) is a former Major League Baseball right fielder. Ray played for the Houston Astros in the  season. In five games, Ray had one hit in six at-bats, with one RBI. He was drafted by the Astros in the 4th round of the 1979 amateur draft.

References

External links

1958 births
Baseball players from Indiana
Daytona Beach Astros players
Houston Astros players
Kentucky Wesleyan Panthers baseball players
Living people
People from Madison, Indiana